Fulham is a western suburb of Adelaide, South Australia. It is located in the City of West Torrens.

History
The area incorporating the current suburb of Fulham was purchased c. 1836 by John White (? –30 December 1860), who named it Fulham Farm after the suburb of Fulham in his native London. The White family home, Weetunga, built by his son, Samuel White (1835?–16 November 1880), father of Samuel Albert White (1870–1954) which took three years to build, remained with the family until placed on the market in 2014, and sold to another South Australian resident for $2.5 million in August 2015. The new owner of the home plans on restoring the home back to its former glory and building a wing to the east of the home.

Both Weetunga and The Oaks in Henley Beach Road are listed on the South Australian Heritage Register.

Geography
Fulham sits on a bend in the River Torrens. The suburb also sits astride the intersection of Tapleys Hill Road and Henley Beach Road.

Demographics

The 2006 census by the Australian Bureau of Statistics counted 2,611 persons in Fulham on census night. Of these, 49.8% were male and 50.2% were female.

The majority of residents (73.5%) are of Australian birth, with other common census responses being Italy (5.4%) and England (5.1%).

The age distribution of Fulham residents is skewed towards an older population than the greater Australian population. 74.1% of residents were over 25 years in 2006, compared to the Australian average of 66.5%; and 25.9% were younger than 25 years, compared to the Australian average of 33.5%.

Community
The local newspaper is the Weekly Times Messenger. Other regional and national newspapers such as The Advertiser and The Australian are also available.

Fulham is represented by the Fulham Falcons Cricket club, which was established in 1905, however now plays home matches on Collins Reserve in neighboring Kidman Park.

Facilities and attractions

Shopping and dining
 BP
 Subway
 Romeo's Foodland
 Hungry Jack's
Domino's Pizza
The well-known Lockleys Hotel is in Fulham as the River Torrens divides the two adjoining suburbs of Lockleys and Fulham

Parks
The largest greenspace in Fulham is Linear Park, lying along the River Torrens on the suburb's southern boundary.

Transportation

Roads
Fulham is serviced by Henley Beach Road, connecting the suburb to Adelaide city centre, and Tapleys Hill Road, one of the major arterial roads in the western suburbs of Adelaide.

Public transport
Fulham is serviced by public transport run by the Adelaide Metro.
H22 to Henley Beach South
H30 to West Lakes
H32 to Henley Beach South
H31 to Henley Square

Bicycle routes
A bicycle path extends along Linear Park.

See also
List of Adelaide suburbs

References

External links

Suburbs of Adelaide